Goa is a tiny region along the west coast of India, and is known for its many sportsmen.

See also
Goans in football
Goans in cricket

External links

Football
 Indian Football
 Goa Football Association